Debby Stam-Pilon (born July 24, 1984 in Zaandijk) is a volleyball player from the Netherlands, who currently plays for French club Rocheville Le Cannet. While she began her career as a wing spiker, starting in 2015 Stam became a libero. She represented her country since 2004, winning the FIVB World Grand Prix 2007. In 2015, she played with the Dutch National Team at the 2015 European Games in Baku, Azerbaijan, and one year later attended the 2016 Summer Olympics in Rio de Janeiro, Brazil.

Personal
Stam is married to Paul Pilon. They have a son, Mees, born in October 2014 and a daughter, Zazie, born in April 2018.

Career

References

External links
 
 
 

1984 births
Living people
Dutch women's volleyball players
Sportspeople from Zaanstad
Volleyball players at the 2015 European Games
Volleyball players at the 2016 Summer Olympics
European Games competitors for the Netherlands
Expatriate volleyball players in Russia
Expatriate volleyball players in Turkey
Expatriate volleyball players in Poland
Expatriate volleyball players in Azerbaijan
Expatriate volleyball players in France
Dutch expatriate sportspeople in Russia
Dutch expatriate sportspeople in Turkey
Dutch expatriate sportspeople in Poland
Dutch expatriate sportspeople in Azerbaijan
Dutch expatriate sportspeople in France
Olympic volleyball players of the Netherlands
20th-century Dutch women
21st-century Dutch women